North Point State Battlefield is a publicly owned historic preserve in Dundalk, Baltimore County, Maryland, that commemorates a portion of the site where the Battle of North Point was fought during the War of 1812. On September 12, 1814, Brigadier General John Stricker commanded forces of the Maryland Militia from within the park's borders. Stricker's men fought the invading British forces from behind a fenceline along the monument's eastern edge.

The  site opened to the public in 2015. Park features include wetlands, permeable parking and trail surfaces, boardwalks, and wildflower meadows. It is a satellite facility of North Point State Park, managed by the Maryland Department of Natural Resources.

References

External links
North Point State Battlefield Maryland Department of Natural Resources

State parks of Maryland
Parks in Baltimore County, Maryland
Landmarks of the War of 1812
2015 establishments in Maryland
Protected areas established in 2015